Events from the year 1646 in Ireland.

Incumbent
Monarch: Charles I

Events
March 3 – the title of Earl of Leinster in the Peerage of Ireland is created for Robert Cholmondeley.
March 28 – the first "Ormonde Peace": the Supreme Council of the Irish Catholic Confederation signs an agreement with James Butler, Marquess of Ormonde, as lieutenant of Charles I of England which would procure some rights for Catholics in return for their military support of the royalists in England, but this is renounced by the Confederation's General Assembly.
June 5 – the Battle of Benburb, part of the Irish Confederate Wars, takes place in County Tyrone. The forces of Catholic Confederate Ireland under Owen Roe O'Neill secure a decisive victory over a Scottish Covenanter and Anglo-Irish army led by Robert Monro.
June 29 – battle at Laught (Leacht), part of the Irish Confederate Wars, between Tadhg Mór and his brother Laughlin Ó Cellaigh (who is killed).

Arts and literature
Henry Burkhead's closet drama Cola's Fury, or Lirenda's Misery, based on the Irish Rebellion of 1641, is published in Kilkenny (dated 1645).

Births
August 24 – Roger Boyle, 2nd Earl of Orrery, politician (d. 1682)
John Davys, politician (d. 1689)
Antoine Hamilton, author (d. 1720)

Deaths
June 29 – Laughlin Ó Cellaigh, chief.

References 

 
1640s in Ireland
Ireland
Years of the 17th century in Ireland